Manuel Méndez (died 1 September 1872) was a Salvadoran politician who served as vice president of El Salvador between February and his assassination in September 1872, as well as serving acting president between May and June 1872. He also served as Minister of the Interior.

Biography 

Méndez was elected as vice president of El Salvador and assumed office on 1 February 1872, serving under President General Santiago González Portillo. On 10 May, he became acting president on behalf of González Portillo, while he commanded an army against Honduran President José María Medina. González Portillo resumed his presidential duties on 16 June.

At 9:00 p.m. on 1 September 1872, Méndez was assassinated in San Salvador's main plaza.

References

Citations

Bibliography 

Year of birth missing
1872 deaths
Vice presidents of El Salvador
Independent politicians
19th-century Salvadoran people
People from Sensuntepeque
People murdered in El Salvador
Assassinated Salvadoran politicians
1872 murders in North America